Ulanhu or Ulanfu ( 23 December 1907 – 8 December 1988), born Yun Ze, was the founding Chairman of China's Inner Mongolia Autonomous Region, serving from 1947 to 1966.

An ethnic Tumed Mongol, he took the nom de guerre Ulanhu and had the nickname of "Mongol Prince” during his political career. He served as Vice-Premier between 1956 and 1966. He was purged during the Cultural Revolution but later reinstated. Between 1983 and 1988 he held the office of Vice President of the People's Republic of China.

Ulanhu was the highest-ranking minority official in PRC history, and became an icon of loyalty both to the Mongolian people and to the PRC. Except for the period of the Cultural Revolution, his family dominated the politics of Inner Mongolia. His son Buhe served as Chairman of Inner Mongolia for a decade, and his granddaughter Bu Xiaolin was appointed to the same position in 2016.

Early career 
Born in Tumed Left Banner, just outside the city of Hohhot, Ulanhu was the child of herders. He went to elementary school in his hometown, and went on to study at the Mongolian-Tibetan College of Beiping (now Beijing). He joined the Socialist Youth League of China (later renamed Communist Youth League) in 1924, intending to become communist revolutionary. In 1925, he joined the Communist Party of China and was sent to Moscow Sun Yat-sen University in the Soviet Union to study Marxism. In Moscow, Ulanhu shared a desk with Chiang Ching-kuo, the son of Chiang Kai-shek.

In 1929, when he returned from his studies, Ulanhu began organizing communist rallies in Mongolia, and was appointed a Committee Member of the CPC's West-Mongolia Working Committee. In 1931, Ulanhu was chosen to run the military and intelligence offices in Mongolia, serving in Ikh Juu League (now the city of Ordos). During the Second World War, Ulanhu led his forces to stop the Japanese from advancing towards Hohhot and led his officers to march to northern Shaanxi where he continued battling against the Japanese forces. In August 1941, he arrived at the revolutionary base of Yan'an to work on ethnic affairs.

Civil war 
During the Chinese Civil War, Ulanhu was one of the commanders of the Pingjin Campaign and the Liaoshen Campaign, he also led his Communist forces to destroy the local bandits and anti-communist forces in Mongolia. Ulanhu was instrumental in bringing Inner Mongolia under the control of the Communist Party of China and was elected the Acting Governor and founding Chairman of the Autonomous Government of Inner Mongolia in 1947. Inner Mongolia was the first of five recognized autonomous regions in China. In September 1954, Ulanhu was named Vice-Premier, ranking eighth.

In 1955 he was awarded the rank of General (shangjiang), becoming one of only 57 generals bestowed the honour of being a "founding general" of the People's Republic. He served as Party Committee Secretary and regional government chairman of Inner Mongolia from the region's founding to 1966.

Cultural Revolution 

At the beginning of the Cultural Revolution, zealous Red Guard organizations attempted to storm the Inner Mongolia government headquarters. Ulanhu used troops at his disposal to repel them, only to be later undone by military forces sent in by leftist leaders in Beijing, ousting him from office. He was accused of "ruling Inner Mongolia like an independent kingdom", and persecuted as a suspected member of the independence-leaning Inner Mongolian People's Revolutionary Party, a charge later proven to be false. However, while he was a target for struggle, Ulanhu survived the Cultural Revolution without enduring some of the more severe physical hardships inflicted upon some of his colleagues, largely owing to the support of Premier Zhou Enlai.

After rehabilitation and death 
Ulanhu was politically rehabilitated in 1973, prior to the 10th Party Congress, with the personal blessing of Mao Zedong. In 1977, Ulanhu became head of the United Front Department of the central organization of the CPC. Among various other posts, he served one term as Vice President of the People's Republic of China under President Li Xiannian from 1983 to 1988. Upon completion of the term as vice-president, he was elected vice-chairman of the National People's Congress. He died shortly thereafter in 1988 after an illness. He was eulogized with high honours by the ruling Communist Party.

In 1992, the Ulanhu Memorial Hall was opened to the public in Hohhot. His Selected Works were published in 1999 at a dedication ceremony attended by Jiang Zemin, General Secretary of the Communist Party of China. In December 2007, the Communist Party held a high-profile conference to commemorate the 100th anniversary of Ulanhu's birth. In 2009, the historic epic Spring Comes Early to the Grasslands aired on China Central Television, and depicted some of Ulanhu's activities during the revolution.

Family
Ulanhu married twice and had four sons and four daughters. His son, Buhe, served as the Chairman of Inner Mongolia from 1982 to 1993. His granddaughter (Buhe's daughter) Bu Xiaolin was appointed Chairwoman of Inner Mongolia in March 2016, making her the third generation of the Ulanhu family to hold that position. Another son of Ulanhu, Uje, served as mayor of Baotou.

See also 
 List of officers of the People's Liberation Army
 Inner Mongolian People's Republic
 Inner Mongolia incident

References 

1907 births
1988 deaths
Chinese Communist Party politicians from Inner Mongolia
Chinese people of Mongolian descent
Members of the 11th Politburo of the Chinese Communist Party
Members of the 12th Politburo of the Chinese Communist Party
Moscow Sun Yat-sen University alumni
People from Hohhot
People's Liberation Army generals from Inner Mongolia
People's Republic of China politicians from Inner Mongolia
Political office-holders in Inner Mongolia
Vice Chairpersons of the National Committee of the Chinese People's Political Consultative Conference
Vice Chairpersons of the National People's Congress
Vice presidents of the People's Republic of China
Victims of the Cultural Revolution